Stonewall Jackson (Thomas J. Jackson, 1824–1863) was a general in the Confederate States Army.

Stonewall Jackson may also refer to:

 Stonewall Jackson (musician) (1932–2021), American 1960s country music singer and musician
 John Jackson (footballer, born 1942), English footballer nicknamed "Stonewall"
 Stonewall Jackson (20th century general) (1891– 1943), American World War II major general

See also
 
 
 Stonewall (disambiguation)